David Plaza is a complex with a shopping mall and a hotel (planned) in Zhengzhou, China. The complex is situated at the crossing of Erqi Road and Taikang Road, within the Erqi commercial area, which is a major shopping district in Zhengzhou. Opened in 2015, it is one of the largest and most luxurious shopping malls in Zhengzhou.

Features

The complex has two towers. Tower A houses a Dennis Department Store and Tower B has been planned to house a hotel. The mall is situated in Tower A and the podium building. The first level of the mall houses many high-end brands, including Louis Vuitton, Cartier, Yves Saint Laurent, Salvatore Ferragamo, Bottega Veneta, Tiffany & Co., Bulgari, etc. There is an ice-skating rink on the 5th level and a CGV cinema on the 6th level. Restaurants are mainly located on levels 10 to 12.

References

Shopping malls in Zhengzhou
2015 establishments in China
Shopping malls established in 2015